Pickle Lake Airport  is located  southwest of Pickle Lake, Ontario, Canada.

Airlines and destinations

Accidents and incidents
On 12 May 1977, Douglas R4D-1 C-FBKV of Patricia Air Services was written off in an accident. One person was killed.
On 11 May 1987, Douglas C-47B C-FADD of Air Manitoba crashed near Pickle Lake after a structural failure of the port wing. The aircraft was on a domestic cargo flight from Big Trout Lake Airport to Pickle Lake Airport. Both crew were killed.
On 17 March 2017, Basler BT-67 C-FKGL of Private Air crashed on take-off for Big Trout Airport, Ontario. All three crew survived.

See also
 Pickle Lake Water Aerodrome

References

External links

Certified airports in Kenora District